The Legislative Council of Newfoundland was the upper house of the General Assembly of Newfoundland from 1833 to 1934.

The Legislative Council was appointed by the governor of Newfoundland, not elected. Bills were submitted by the House of Assembly to the Council, which could approve, reject or amend them; if amended, bills were returned to the House of Assembly for approval.

From 1842 to 1848, the elected House of Assembly and appointed Legislative Council sat together as a single Amalgamated Assembly. After 1848, the two legislative bodies again sat separately.

In 1854, the British Government granted a new constitution to Newfoundland establishing an Executive Council of not more than seven members of the majority party and a Legislative Council of not more than 15 members upon nomination of the ministry.

The Legislative Council of Newfoundland and the House of Assembly met for the last time in February 1934 to pass the legislation which provided for their suspensions. The Royal Commission which was established in 1933 concluded that Newfoundland's problems were self-made, as noted in the Amulree Report, and it was recommended that the legislature be suspended and be replaced by a Commission of Government appointed by the British Government.

When the Newfoundland House of Assembly was reinstituted following the admission of the colony into Canadian Confederation the Legislative Council was not brought back into existence. However, Term 14(2) of the Newfoundland Terms of Union allows for the province to re-establish the Legislative Council.

See also
 Dominion of Newfoundland
 Responsible government
Legislative Council

References 

Political history of Newfoundland and Labrador
Defunct upper houses in Canada
Pre-Confederation Newfoundland
Dominion of Newfoundland
1854 establishments in Newfoundland
1934 disestablishments in Newfoundland